Jaroslava Muchová Syllabová (15 March 1909 – 9 November 1986) was a Czech painter, the daughter of painter Alphonse Mucha and the sister of writer and translator Jiří Mucha.

Biography
Muchová was born in New York on 15 March 1909 her parents were in the United States while her father tried unsuccessfully to raise funds to support his project The Slav Epic.

As a child she studied ballet, but eventually followed in the footsteps of her father: she assisted in the creation of the Slav Epic by mixing colours and tracing detail studies onto the giant canvases ready for painting. She was responsible for painting the entire starry sky of Slavs in their Original Homeland: Between the Turanian Whip and the sword of the Goths. She also modelled for several of the figures that appear in the series.

After World War II, she took on the restoration of works from the Slav Epic that had been damaged by frost and water when they were stored away to hide them from the Nazis.

Alphonse Mucha pictured her on the reverse of the first Czechoslovak ten koruna banknote from 1919, and later on the 1929 50 koruna banknote.

She died 9 November 1986 in Prague, Czechoslovakia.

References

Sources

1909 births
1986 deaths
20th-century Czech painters
20th-century Czech women artists
Czech women painters